Good clinical data management practice (GCDMP) is the current industry standards for clinical data management that consist of best business practice and acceptable regulatory standards. In all phases of clinical trials, clinical and laboratory information must be collected and converted to digital form for analysis and reporting purposes.  The U.S. Food and Drug Administration and International Conference on Harmonisation of Technical Requirements for Registration of Pharmaceuticals for Human Use have provided specific regulations and guidelines surrounding this component of the drug and device development process.  The effective, efficient and regulatory-compliant management of clinical trial data is an essential component of drug and device development.

The Society for Clinical Data Management (SCDM) has created the Good Clinical Data Management Practices (GCDMP©) standard, a comprehensive document that provides guidance on accepted practices of clinical data management (CDM) that are not totally covered by current guidelines and regulations.  This document is updated by Subject Matter Experts on a continuous basis.

See also 

 U.S. Department of Health and Human Services
 Food and Drug Administration
 Center for Biologics Evaluation and Research (CBER), Center for Drug Evaluation and Research (CDER), Center for Devices and Radiological Health (CDRH), Center for Food Safety and Nutrition (CFSAN), Center for Veterinary Medicine (CVM), Office of Regulatory Affairs (ORA). 
 Good clinical practice
 GxP

References

External links 

 Title 21 Code of Federal Regulations (21 CFR Part 11), Electronic Records; Electronic Signatures, Final Rule Published in the Federal Register

Clinical research
Clinical data management
Good practice